

Events 
March 23 – English premiere of Handel's Messiah before royalty at the Theatre Royal, Covent Garden in London.
Johann Sebastian Bach examines the organ at the Johanniskirche, Leipzig.
1743–1746 Bach revises his St Matthew Passion (two organs used again, but viola da gamba still retained; recitatives revised so that now only the vox Christi recitatives have sustained continuo parts). No evidence of version being performed (version we know today).

Classical music 
Carl Philipp Emanuel Bach – Keyboard Sonata in B minor, H.32.5
William Boyce – Solomon (serenata)
Maurice Greene – "Thou visitest the earth" (Song)
George Frideric Handel
Samson (oratorio, composed 1741–42, premiered 18 February 1732 at Covent Garden in London)
Semele, HWV 58 (oratorio, composed 3 June to 4 July, not performed until 1744)
Joseph and His Brethren, HWV 59
Te Deum in D major, HWV 283
Organ Concerto in A major, HWV 307
 Niccolò Jommelli – La Betulia liberata (sacred oratorio)
 Johann Ludwig Krebs – 6 Trios, Krebs-WV 317–322
 James Oswald – Colin's Kisses, a set of 12 songs.
 Giuseppe Tartini – 12 Violin Sonatas, published in Rome in 1745 as Op. 2 and in Paris, ca. 1747 as Op. 3 (at least two other publications are known as Op. 2, including the 6 Violin Sonatas published in Amsterdam in this year, but there are no other collections published as Op. 3)
 Valentin Rathgeber – Pastorellen für die Weihnachtszeit, R 322

Opera
Joseph Bodin de Boismortier – Don Quichotte chez la duchesse, Op.97
Bernard de Bury – Les Caractères de la folie
Baldassare Galuppi – Enrico
Christoph Willibald Gluck – Demofoonte, Wq.3
Carl Heinrich Graun – Artaserse
Johann Adolph Hasse – Antigono
Niccolò Jommelli – Demofoonte
Domingo Terradellas – Merope

Publications
Francesco Geminiani – Pièces de clavecin tirées des differens ouvrages de Mr F. Geminiani adaptées par luy même (arrangements, mostly from Opp. 1 and 4)
Maurice Greene – 40 Select Anthems in Score
Louis-Gabriel Guillemain – 6 Sonates en quatuors, ou conversations galantes, for flute, violin, viola da gamba, and basso continuo, Op. 12 (Paris)
Jean-Marie Leclair – Quatrième livre de sonates, for violin (two alternatively for flute) and basso continuo, Op. 9 (Paris)
 Giovanni Benedetto Platti – 6 Flute Sonatas, Op. 3 (Nuremberg)
 Giuseppe Sammartini – 12 Trio Sonatas, Op. 3 (Paris)
 Giuseppe Tartini – VI Sonate, for violin and basso continuo, Op. 2 (Amsterdam) (two other collections were published as Op. 2, VI concerti a 8 in Amsterdam, 1734, and 12 Sonatas for violin and basso continuo in Rome, 1745, but also in Paris, ca. 1747 as Op. 3)

Births 
February 19 – Luigi Boccherini, composer (died 1805)
May 17 – Christoph Bernhard Verspoell, composer and priest (died 1818)
May 21 – François Duval, dancer
July 6 – Valentin Adamberger, operatic tenor (died 1804)
July 14 – Gavrila Derzhavin, poet (died 1816)
September 30 – Christian Ehregott Weinlig, cantor and composer (died 1813)
October 5 – Giuseppe Gazzaniga, composer (died 1818)
October 10 – Marie-Madeleine Guimard, ballerina (died 1816)
November 18 – Johannes Ewald, librettist and dramatist (died 1781)
December 7 – Johann Joachim Eschenburg, translator (died 1820)
Date unknown 
Charles-Georges Boyer, music publisher (died c. 1806)
George Saville Carey, librettist and entertainer (died 1807)

Deaths 
 February 1 – Giuseppe Ottavio Pitoni (born 1657)
 February 6 – Toussaint Bertin de la Doué, composer (born 1680)
 February 7 – Lodovico Giustini, composer (born 1685)
March 9 – Jean-Baptiste de Lully, son of Jean-Baptiste Lully (born 1665)
March 16 – Jean-Baptiste Matho, composer (born 1663)
April 20 – Alexandre-François Desportes, copyist and painter (born 1661)
July 12 – Johann Bernhard Bach (the younger), organist and composer (born 1700)
August 13 – Johann Elias Schlegel, librettist and poet (born 1719)
September 14 – Georg von Bertouch, composer (born 1668)
October 5 – Henry Carey, poet, dramatist, songwriter and theatrical composer, suicide (born 1687) 

 
18th century in music
Music by year